Amedeo Andrea Gargano (1887–1970) was an Italian wrestler. He competed at the 1912 Summer Olympics and the 1924 Summer Olympics.

References

External links
 

1887 births
1970 deaths
Olympic wrestlers of Italy
Wrestlers at the 1912 Summer Olympics
Wrestlers at the 1924 Summer Olympics
Italian male sport wrestlers
Sportspeople from Genoa